The Premature Father (French: Le père prématuré) is a 1933 French comedy film directed by René Guissart and starring Fernand Gravey, Edith Méra and Saturnin Fabre.

It was made at the Joinville Studios by the French subsidiary of Paramount Pictures.

Cast
 Fernand Gravey as Édouard Puma & Fred 
 Edith Méra as Dolorès 
 Saturnin Fabre as Le père Puma 
 Denise Dorian as Suzy 
 Régine Barry as Valérie Marbois 
 Blanche Denège as Madame Puma 
 Léonce Corne
 Dany Lorys
 Lise Hestia

References

Bibliography 
 Dayna Oscherwitz & MaryEllen Higgins. The A to Z of French Cinema. Scarecrow Press, 2009.

External links 
 

1933 films
1933 comedy films
French comedy films
1930s French-language films
Films directed by René Guissart
Films shot at Joinville Studios
Paramount Pictures films
French black-and-white films
1930s French films